Dr. Buzzard's Original Savannah Band Goes to Washington is the third studio album by Dr. Buzzard's Original Savannah Band. It was the last album recorded by the original line-up. The album was a commercial failure, not making the top 100 on either the Pop or the R&B chart.

The album's full title is James Monroe H.S. Presents Dr. Buzzard's Original Savannah Band Goes to Washington.

Critical reception
The Washington Post wrote: "Stony Browder captures the cosmopolitan richness of a big city on the record as he mixes black, white and Latin musics from the '40s, '60s and '70s. 'Call Me' makes the unlikely ingredients of Beach Boys harmonies, Latin rhumba, synthesizer effects and dixieland clarinet blend seamlessly. Browder composes so imaginatively that the 'chinka-chinka' beat that underlies almost every cut is relegated to the subconscious. One can dance to these songs with the brain going numb."

The Rolling Stone Album Guide wrote that the album "recaptures the insouciant buzz of the debut—and adds a dose of social reality."

Track listing

Personnel
 Cory Daye – vocals
 Stony Browder Jr. – guitar, piano, vocals, producer
 August Darnell – bass, vocals
 "Sugar Coated" Andy Hernandez – vibes, marimba
 Mickey Sevilla – drums, percussion
 David Wolfert – producer
 Gary Klein – producer
 John Arrias – engineer
 Charles Koppelman – executive producer

References

External links
 

1979 albums
Dr. Buzzard's Original Savannah Band albums
Albums produced by Gary Klein (producer)
Elektra Records albums